The Nokia C5-03 is a budget resistive touchscreen smartphone with WLAN from the Cseries that was released in December 2010. The phone has Shazam music identification software and social networking software included or available for download.

It has Assisted GPS, and Ovi Maps 3.0 integrated.

Hardware

References
Nokia C5-03 刷机说明

Nokia smartphones
Portable media players
Handwriting recognition
S60 (software platform)
Digital audio players
Personal digital assistants
Devices capable of speech recognition
Mobile phones introduced in 2010
Mobile phones with user-replaceable battery